CoEvolution Quarterly (1974–1985) was a journal descended from Stewart Brand's Whole Earth Catalog. Stewart Brand founded the CoEvolution Quarterly in 1974 using proceeds from the Whole Earth Catalog. It evolved out of the original Supplement to the Whole Earth Catalog. Fred Turner notes that in 1985, Brand merged CoEvolution Quarterly with The Whole Earth Software Review (a supplement to The Whole Earth Software Catalog) to create the Whole Earth Review.

CoEvolution Quarterly became the first place to publish Ivan Illich's Vernacular Values.

References
 Binkley, Sam. Getting Loose: Lifestyle Consumption in the 1970s. Durham: Duke University Press, 2007.
 Kirk, Andrew G.  Counterculture Green: The Whole Earth Catalog and American Environmentalism. Lawrence: Univ. of Kansas Press, 2007.

Notes

External links
 Official website
 Futurism and All That: The CoEvolution Quarterly $2.50 at newstands in Harvard Sq. – The Harvard Crimson

Quarterly magazines published in the United States
Defunct political magazines published in the United States
Magazines established in 1974
Magazines disestablished in 1984
Magazines published in California
Whole Earth Catalog